Alvear is a village in Argentina, located in the Rosario Department of Santa Fe Province.

References

Populated places in Santa Fe Province
Populated places established in 1911
1911 establishments in Argentina